is a railway station on the West Japan Railway Company Kansai Main Line (Yamatoji Line) in Hirano-ku, Osaka, Osaka Prefecture, Japan.

Layout
The station on the Yamatoji Line has a side platform serving a track, an island platform serving two tracks and a passing track for Tennoji.

Surroundings
Japan National Route 25
Sumitomo Mitsui Banking Corporation Hirano Branch
Osaka Municipal Hirano Library
Hirano Police Station (Osaka Prefecture)

Buses
JR Hirano-eki (Osaka Municipal Transportation Bureau):

Route 19 for  via  / for Kami-higashi Sanchoma-higashi
Route 30 for  via , Kumata, and Teradacho / for Hirano Kuyakusho-mae via 

Hirano-ekimae (Kintetsu Bus Co., Ltd.):
Route 40 (Kami Route) for -ekimae

History 
Station numbering was introduced in March 2018 with Kami being assigned station number JR-Q22.

References 

Hirano-ku, Osaka
Railway stations in Osaka
Railway stations in Japan opened in 1889